is a Japanese former basketball player who competed in the 2004 Summer Olympics.

Personal life

She has been married to Ryuzo Anzai, a head coach of the Tochigi Brex.

References

1980 births
Living people
Japanese women's basketball players
Olympic basketball players of Japan
Basketball players at the 2004 Summer Olympics
21st-century Japanese women